Jan Boller (born 14 March 2000) is a German professional footballer who plays as a centre-back for LASK and their reserve team Juniors OÖ.

Career
Boller made his professional debut for FC Juniors OÖ in the Austrian Football Second League on 9 August 2019, starting in the home match against Kapfenberger SV, which finished as a 1–0 win.

References

External links
 
 
 
 
 

2000 births
Living people
Sportspeople from Siegen
Footballers from North Rhine-Westphalia
German footballers
Association football central defenders
Germany youth international footballers
2. Liga (Austria) players
Bayer 04 Leverkusen players
LASK players
FC Juniors OÖ players
German expatriate footballers
German expatriate sportspeople in Austria
Expatriate footballers in Austria